Walter Steiner (born 23 September 1946) is a Swiss sailor. He competed in the Tornado event at the 1976 Summer Olympics.

References

External links
 

1946 births
Living people
Swiss male sailors (sport)
Olympic sailors of Switzerland
Sailors at the 1976 Summer Olympics – Tornado
Place of birth missing (living people)